These are the official results of the Women's 800 metres event at the 1983 IAAF World Championships in Helsinki, Finland. There were a total number of 27 participating athletes, with four qualifying heats, two semi-finals and the final held on Tuesday 9 August 1983.

Medalists

Records
Existing records at the start of the event.

Final

Semi-finals
Held on Monday 8 August 1983

Qualifying heats
Held on Sunday 7 August 1983

References
 Results

 
800 metres at the World Athletics Championships
1983 in women's athletics